Dwight Douglas "Sandy" Campbell (born February 26, 1946, in Buffalo, New York) is an American retired slalom canoeist who competed from the late 1960s to the early 1970s. He finished 28th in the K-1 event at the 1972 Summer Olympics in Munich.

References
Sports-reference.com profile

1946 births
Sportspeople from Buffalo, New York
American male canoeists
Canoeists at the 1972 Summer Olympics
Living people
Olympic canoeists of the United States